Aleksandr Ivanovich Makas (born 8 October 1991) is a Belarusian professional football player currently playing for Dinamo Brest.

Career
Makas made his debut for the senior national side of his country on 30 March 2015, in a friendly match against Gabon.

Honours
Minsk
Belarusian Cup winner: 2012–13

Gomel
Belarusian Cup winner: 2021–22

References

External links
 
 

1991 births
Living people
Footballers from Minsk
Belarusian footballers
Association football forwards
Belarusian expatriate footballers
Expatriate footballers in Kazakhstan
Expatriate footballers in Lithuania
Belarus international footballers
Kazakhstan Premier League players
FC Minsk players
FC Partizan Minsk players
FC Atyrau players
FC Torpedo-BelAZ Zhodino players
FC Dinamo Minsk players
FC Isloch Minsk Raion players
FK Sūduva Marijampolė players
FC Gomel players
FC Dynamo Brest players